The 1992–93 Lebanese Premier League season was the 33rd season of the Lebanese Premier League, the top Lebanese league for association football clubs in the country, established in 1934.

Ansar, who were the defending champions, won their fifth consecutive—and overall—Lebanese Premier League title.

League table

Top scorers

References

External links 

 RSSSF

Lebanese Premier League seasons
Lebanon
1